Alden may refer to:

Places

United States
Alden, California, a former settlement
Alden, Colorado
Alden, Illinois
Alden, Iowa
Alden, Kansas
Alden, Michigan
Alden, Minnesota
Alden, Oklahoma
Alden, Pennsylvania
Alden, New York
Alden (village), New York
Alden, Wisconsin
Alden, Virginia
Alden Township, McHenry County, Illinois
Alden Township, Freeborn County, Minnesota
Alden Township, St. Louis County, Minnesota
Alden Township, Hettinger County, North Dakota
Alden Township, Hand County, South Dakota

Elsewhere
Alden (crater), on the moon
Alden, Norway, a small island in Sogn og Fjordane county
2941 Alden, an asteroid
Alden Valley, Lancashire, England

Other uses
Alden (name)
Alden House (disambiguation), various houses on the National Register of Historic Places
Alden Research Laboratory, a hydraulic laboratory in Massachusetts
Alden Rowing
Alden Shoe Company, a men's shoemaker in Middleborough, Massachusetts
Alden v. Maine, a 1999 US Supreme Court case 
USS Alden, a US Navy destroyer

See also